The Bar Sinister is a lost 1917 silent film drama directed by Edgar Lewis. An independent film, it was released on a State Rights basis.

Story
The film is about a white woman who is part black (or negro as it was called). The semi-derogatory term and now archaic "bar sinister" meant a person who was half-breed or half-caste particularly concerning the issue of black/and white.

Cast
Preston Rollow - Col. George Stilliter
Mary Doyle - Annabel
William Anderson - Sam Davis
Florence St. Leonard - Lindy
Hedda Nova - Belle Davis
Mitchell Lewis - Ben Swift
Frank Reilly - Big Tom
George Dangerfield - Luke Waller
Ray Chamberlin - Nick Benson
Victor Sutherland - Page Warren
Jules Cowles - Buck
William J. Gross - 
William A. Williams -
Mack V. Wright -

References

External links
The Bar Sinister at IMDb.com

lobby poster

1917 films
American silent feature films
American black-and-white films
Films directed by Edgar Lewis
Silent American drama films
1917 drama films
Lost American films
1917 lost films
Lost drama films
1910s American films